In Greek mythology, Hermaphroditus or Hermaphroditos was a child of Aphrodite and Hermes. According to Ovid, he was born a remarkably handsome boy whom the naiad Salmacis attempted to rape and prayed to be united with forever. A god, in answer to her prayer, merged their two forms into one and transformed him into a hermaphrodite, he being considered the origin of the name. Their name is compounded of his parents' names, Hermes and Aphrodite. They were one of the Erotes.

Because Hermaphroditus was a child of Hermes, and consequently a great-grandchild of Atlas (Hermes's mother Maia was the daughter of Atlas), sometimes they are called Atlantiades.

Symbolism

Hermaphroditus, the two-sexed child of Aphrodite and Hermes (Venus and Mercury) had long been a symbol of androgyny or effeminacy, and was portrayed in Greco-Roman art as a female figure with male genitals.

Theophrastus's account also suggests a link between Hermaphroditus and the institution of marriage. The reference to the fourth day of the month is telling: this is the luckiest day to have a wedding.  association with marriage seems to have been that, by embodying both masculine and feminine qualities, they symbolized the coming together of men and women in sacred union. Another factor linking Hermaphroditus to weddings was their parents' role in protecting and blessing brides.

Hermaphroditus's name is derived from those of their parents Hermes and Aphrodite. All three of these gods figure largely among erotic and fertility figures, and all possess distinctly sexual overtones. Sometimes, Hermaphroditus is referred to as Aphroditus.

Mythology

Ovid's account relates that Hermaphroditus was nursed by naiads in the caves of Mount Ida, a sacred mountain in Phrygia (present day Turkey). At the age of fifteen, they grew bored with their surroundings and traveled to the cities of Lycia and Caria. It was in the woods of Caria, near Halicarnassus (modern Bodrum, Turkey) that they encountered the nymph Salmacis, in her pool. She was overcome by lust for the child, who was very handsome but still young, and tried to seduce them, but was rejected. When they thought she had left, Hermaphroditus undressed and entered the waters of the empty pool. Salmacis sprang out from behind a tree and jumped into the pool. She wrapped herself around the youth, forcibly kissing them and touching their breast. While they struggled, she called out to the gods that they should never part. Her wish was granted, and their bodies blended into one form, "a creature of both sexes". Hermaphroditus prayed to Hermes and Aphrodite that anyone else who bathed in the pool would be similarly transformed, and their wish was granted.

Hungarian classical philologist Károly Kerényi wrote: "In this form the story was certainly not ancient". He related it to the Greek myths involving male youths (ephebes), noting the legends of Narcissus and Hyacinth, who had archaic hero-cults, and also those involving Hymen (Hymenaios).

Diodorus Siculus, in his work Library of History, mentions that some say that Hermaphroditus is a god and appears at certain times among men, but there are some who declare that such creatures of two sexes are monstrosities, and coming rarely into the world as they do have the quality of presaging the future, sometimes for evil and sometimes for good.

In a description found on the remains of a wall in Halicarnassus, Hermaphroditus' mother, Aphrodite, names Salmacis as the nymph who nursed and took care of an infant Hermaphroditus after being placed in her care, a very different version than the one presented by Ovid.

The satirical author Lucian of Samosata also implies that Hermaphroditus was born like that, rather than becoming later in life against their will, and blames it on the identity of the child's father, Hermes.

Cult and worship

The oldest traces of the cult in Greek countries are found in Cyprus. Here, according to Macrobius (Saturnalia, iii. 8), there was a bearded statue of a male Aphrodite, called Aphroditus by Aristophanes. Philochorus in his Atthis (ap. Macrobius loc. cit.) further identified this divinity, at whose sacrifices men and women exchanged garments, with the Moon. A terracotta plaque from the 7th century BC depicting Aphroditos was found in Perachora, which suggests it was an archaic Greek cult.

The deification and the origins of the cult of Hermaphroditus beings stem from Eastern religions, where the hermaphrodite nature expressed the idea of a primitive being that united both sexes. This double sex also attributed to Dionysus and Priapus – the union in one being of the two principles of generation and conception – denotes extensive fertilizing and productive powers.

This Cyprian Aphrodite is the same as the later Hermaphroditos, which simply means Aphroditos in the form of a herma, and first occurs in the Characters (16) of Theophrastus. After its introduction at Athens (probably in the 5th century BC), the importance of this deity seems to have declined. It appears no longer as the object of a special cult, but limited to the homage of certain sects, expressed by superstitious rites of obscure significance.

We find in Alciphron that there was at Athens a temple of Hermaphroditus. The passage proposes that he might be considered as the deity who presided over married people; the strict union between husband and wife being aptly represented by a deity, who was male and female inseparably blended together.

In Greek Anthology, at the chapter in which describe the statues in the Baths of Zeuxippus, it also mention and describe a statue of Hermaphroditus.

Literature

The earliest mention of Hermaphroditus in Greek literature is by the philosopher Theophrastus (3rd century BC), in his book The Characters, XVI The Superstitious Man, in which he portrays various types of eccentric people.

The first mention of Hermes and Aphrodite as Hermaphroditus's parents was by the Greek historian, Diodorus Siculus (1st century BC), in his book Bibliotheca historica, book IV, 4.6.5.

The only full narration of his myth is that of Ovid's Metamorphoses, IV.274–388 (8 AD), where the emphasis is on the feminine snares of the lascivious water-nymph Salmacis and her compromising of Hermaphroditus' erstwhile budding manly strength, detailing his bashfulness and the engrafting of their bodies.

A rendering of the story into an epyllion, published anonymously in 1602, was later (1640) attributed by some to Francis Beaumont.

Ausonius in his Epigramata de diversis rebus / Epigrams on various matters (4th century), also tells of Hermaphroditus' parentage and union with the nymph Salmacis.

In the Palatine Anthology, IX.783 (980 AD), there is a reference to a sculpture of Hermaphroditus which was placed in a bath for both sexes. The passage IX.317 is in dialogue form, based on the dialogue between Hermaphroditus and Silenus. The latter claims that he has had sexual intercourse with Hermaphroditus three times. Hermaphroditus complains and objects to the fact by invoking Hermes in an oath, while Silenus invokes Pan for the reliability of his allegations.

Algernon Charles Swinburne's poem "Hermaphroditus" in Poems and Ballads is subscribed Au Musée du Louvre, Mars 1863, leaving no doubt that it was the Borghese Hermaphroditus that had inspired his ode.

In art

Paintings and engravings
In Greek vase painting Hermaphroditus was depicted as a winged youth (erotes) with male and female attributes.
Roman frescos found at Pompeii and Herculaneum show Hermaphroditus in various styles, alone and interacting with satyrs, Pan and Silenus.
The Nymph Salmacis and Hermaphroditus by Francois-Joseph Navez, Museum of Fine Arts, Ghent
Salmacis and Hermaphroditus by Bartholomeus Spranger, Kunsthistorisches Museum, Wien
Salmacis and Hermaphroditus by Scarsellino, Galleria Borghese, Rome
Salmacis and Hermaphroditus by Jean François de Troy
Salmacis and Hermaphroditus by Ludovico Carracci
Salmacis and Hermaphroditus by Francesco Albani
Salmacis and Hermaphroditus by Giovanni Antonio Pellegrini
Salmacis and Hermaphroditus by Jean-Auguste-Dominique Ingres
Salmacis and Hermaphroditus by Bernard Picart
Salmacis and Hermaphroditus by Johann Wilhelm Baur
Salmacis and Hermaphroditus by Virgil Solis
Hermaphroditus and Salmacis by Louis Finson
The Nymph of Salmacis by Rupert Bunny
Hermaphrodite Among Roses by Aubrey Beardsley
Hermaphrodite Figure by Jacopo Pontormo
The metamorphosis of Hermaphrodite and Salmacis by Jan Gossaert (Jan Mabuse)
Salmacis et Hermaphrodite by Jean Daullé

Sculpture
The most famous sculpture of this figure is the Sleeping Hermaphroditus.
Hermaphroditus, Palais des Beaux-Arts de Lille
A life size sculpture of Hermaphroditus from Pergamon is one of the largest found standing 186.5 cm tall at the İstanbul Archaeology Museums.
A statue by John Henry Foley was shown at the 1851 Great Exhibition and later donated to the Bancroft Gardens, Stratford-upon-Avon where it now stands.
A marble statue of Hermaphroditus was found near the south end of the Garden. II.2.2. Room 13, House of Loreius Tiburtinus

Modern popular culture
 The myth is the subject of the Genesis song "Fountain of Salmacis", on their 1971 album Nursery Cryme.
 They are an important supporting character for Wonder Woman in the DC Rebirth, where they are called Atlantiades.

See also
 Intersex in history

Notes

References
 Lucian, Dialogues of the Gods; translated by Fowler, H W and F G. Oxford: The Clarendon Press. 1905.
 Ovid. Metamorphoses, Volume I: Books 1-8. Translated by Frank Justus Miller. Revised by G. P. Goold. Loeb Classical Library No. 42. Cambridge, Massachusetts: Harvard University Press, 1977, first published 1916. .

Attribution

External links

Hermaphroditus at Encyclopædia Britannica Online

Androgynous and hermaphroditic deities
Metamorphoses into the opposite sex in Greek mythology
Characters in Roman mythology
Love and lust gods
Deities of classical antiquity
Children of Hermes
Children of Aphrodite
Fertility deities
Sexuality in ancient Rome
Intersex in religion and mythology
Greek love and lust deities
Intersex in history
Metamorphoses characters
Mythological Greek tutors of gods
Personifications in Greek mythology
Erotes